Zoljanah is a ten wheel drive, highly mobile heavy truck designed and built in Iran. It is used to carry the Bavar 373 air defence system which includes the Fakour command and control system. This has the ability to collect information from all sources relevant to air defense, including passive and active military radars (such as the Mersad), signal surveillance, missile systems and command and control systems.

References 

 
 
 

Military trucks
Vehicles of Iran